Montcuq-en-Quercy-Blanc (Languedocien: Montcuc en Carcin Blanc) is a commune in the department of Lot, southern France. The municipality was established on 1 January 2016 by merger of the former communes of Montcuq, Belmontet, Lebreil, Sainte-Croix and Valprionde.

See also 
Communes of the Lot department

References 

Communes of Lot (department)
Quercy